Rakhiot Peak is a peak in the Himalayas range of the Gilgit-Baltistan, Pakistan. It is one of the many subsidiary summits of the Nanga Parbat massif.

Location
It lies just south of the Indus River in the Diamer District. Not far to the north is the western end of the Karakoram range.

Layout of the mountain

The core of Nanga Parbat is a long ridge trending southwest–northeast. The southwestern portion of this main ridge is known as the Mazeno Ridge, and has a number of subsidiary peaks. In the other direction from the summit, the main ridge starts as the East Ridge before turning more northeast at Rakhiot Peak (7,070 m), about 4 km northeast of the Nanga Parbat summit. The Silver Saddle (Silbersackel) is about halfway in-between Rakhiot Peak and Nanga Parbat summit. The north/northwest side of the mountain, leading to the Indus, is more complex. It is split into the Diamir (west) face and the Rakhiot (north) face by a long ridge. There are a number of subsidiary summits, including the North Peak (7,816 m) some 3 km north of the main summit.

See also
 Nanga Parbat
 Eight-thousander
List of highest mountains on Earth

References

External links
 
 Nanga Parbat on summitpost.org
 BBC Story on Rescue of Tomaz Humar
 A mountain list ranked by local relief and steepness showing Nanga Parbat as the World #1
 Northern Pakistan detailed placemarks in Google Earth

Mountains of Gilgit-Baltistan
Seven-thousanders of the Himalayas